Booker T. Washington Junior College, the first and longest-lasting junior college for African Americans in Florida, was established by the Escambia County school board in 1949. Previously, the only higher education available in Florida to African Americans was at Bethune-Cookman College, Edward Waters College, Florida A&M University, and Florida Memorial College, all historically black.

The College, named for the famous black intellectual Booker T. Washington, shared facilities and administrator with Booker T. Washington High School, in Pensacola, Florida. Its founding and only president and dean, and principal of the high school, was Garrett T. Wiggins, the only educator in northwest Florida with an earned doctorate, described as "the smartest man in Escambia County". Its first class, with 23 students, graduated in 1951. At its peak the college enrolled 361 students. In 1965, in response to the pressures for integration, Washington Junior College was closed. It is often said that the college was merged with Pensacola Junior College (now Pensacola State College), but like Roosevelt Junior College and other Florida black junior colleges, it is more accurate to say it was closed. None of the faculty got similarly-paying jobs, and black student enrollment did not transfer en masse to PJC, where students found, at best, an indifferent reception.

See also
 List of things named after Booker T. Washington
 Gibbs Junior College
 Roosevelt Junior College
 Carver Junior College
 Jackson Junior College
 Hampton Junior College
 Rosenwald Junior College
 Suwannee River Junior College
 Volusia County Junior College
 Collier-Blocker Junior College
 Lincoln Junior College
 Johnson Junior College

References

Historically black universities and colleges in the United States
Educational institutions established in 1949
Educational institutions disestablished in 1965
Pensacola, Florida
Education in Escambia County, Florida
Two-year colleges in the United States
African-American history of Florida
1949 establishments in Florida
1965 disestablishments in Florida
Florida's black junior colleges
Booker T. Washington

External links

 Booker T. Washington Junior College digital collections :  Digitized archives and historical material related to Booker T. Washington Junior College, made available in the Pensacola State College Digital Collections.